This is a list of broadcast television stations that are licensed in the U.S. state of California.

Full-power stations
VC refers to the station's PSIP virtual channel. RF refers to the station's physical RF channel.

Defunct full-power stations
Channel 8: KMBY-TV - ABC/CBS/DuM/NBC - Monterey (8/17/1953-2/2/1955; shared time with KSBW-TV) 
Channel 16: KKOG-TV - Ind. - Ventura (12/14/1968-9/13/1969)
Channel 18: KCHU - Ind - San Bernardino (8/1/1962-6/25/1964)
Channel 21: KDAS - Ind. - Hanford/Fresno (2/27/1962-12/22/1964)
Channel 21: KSJV-TV - Ind. - Hanford/Fresno (2/10/1966-5/13/1966)
Channel 27: KVVG - Ind. - Tulare/Fresno (11/16/1953-8/6/1957)
Channel 28: KTHE - ETV - Los Angeles (8/3/1953-9/10/1954)
Channel 30: KHOF-TV - Ind. - Glendale (10/12/1969-5/23/1983)
Channel 32: KSAN-TV - Ind. - San Francisco (3/9/1954-6/21/1958)
Channel 32: KNEW-TV - Ind. - San Francisco (7/1/1968-4/15/1971)
Channel 32: KQEC - PBS - San Francisco (6/28/1971-8/23/1972 and 1/?/1977-1988)
Channel 36: KTVU - NBC - Stockton (12/18/1953-4/30/1955)
Channel 38: KUDO - Ind. - San Francisco (12/28/1968-4/15/1971)
Channel 38: KVOF-TV - Ind. - San Francisco (8/4/1974-10/18/1985)
Channel 40: KCCC-TV - Sacramento (9/30/1953-5/31/1957)
Channel 40: KVUE - Sacramento (11/1/1959-3/21/1960)
Channel 42: KCFT-TV - Ind. - Concord (2/5/1966-9/19/1966)
Channel 43: KICU-TV - Ind. - Visalia/Fresno (12/23/1961-10/18/1968)
Channel 53: KBID-TV - Ind. - Fresno (2/8/1954-7/15/1954)
Channel 68: KVST-TV - ETV - Los Angeles (5/5/1974-12/23/1975)
Channel 68: KEEF-TV - ETV - Los Angeles (3/15/1987-8/8/1987)

LPTV stations

Translators

See also
Bally Sports San Diego
Bally Sports West
List of Spanish-language television networks in the United States
List of television stations in the San Francisco Bay Area
NBC Sports Bay Area
NBC Sports California
Spectrum SportsNet
Spectrum SportsNet LA
Television stations in Baja California for stations across the Mexican border serving San Diego and El Centro

References

California
 
Television stations